

Births
 18 January – Jim Matt, country music singer.
 18 January – Patrick Esposito Di Napoli, member of Les Colocs (d.1994).
 25 January – Andrew MacNaughtan, photographer and music video director (d.2012).
 30 January – Patricia Conroy, country music singer.
 1 February – Dwayne Goettel, former member of Skinny Puppy (d.1995).
 6 February – Gordon Downie, lead singer and lyricist for The Tragically Hip.
 8 March – Denise Murray, country music singer.
 8 June – Mark Howard, audio engineer.
 17 August – Colin James, Juno Award-winning singer-songwriter, and guitarist.
 12 September – Greg McConnell, indie rocker and member of Absolute Whores (d.1999).
 16 November – Diana Krall, Grammy and Juno Awards winning jazz musician.
 29 November – Jesse Cook, Juno Award-winning guitarist.
 30 November – Edwin Orion Brownell, neo-classical composer and concert pianist.
 7 December – Kyp Harness, folk singer and social activist.

Full date unknown
 Charest, Benoît, guitarist and film score composer.
 Danna, Jeff, film score composer
 Lee, Brent, composer and professor of Music Composition at the University of Windsor.
 Ichkhanian, Levon, jazz composer and guitarist

Events

Albums released
 Lorne Greene, The Man

Awards
 28 December, the 1st RPM Awards are announced.

Festivals
 Mariposa Folk Festival was held at the Maple Leaf Stadium
 Miramichi Folksong Festival
 Montreal Festivals

Magazines and publications
 24 February – RPM publishes first issue.

Music groups
Bands formed
 3's a Crowd (band)
 Chai Folk Ensemble
 Jack London & The Sparrows
 The Mynah Birds

Bands disbanded
 CBC Symphony Orchestra
 The Crew-Cuts

Organisations
 Alberta Music Festival Association is established to coordinate local music competition.

Record labels

Singles released
 "My Baby's Comin' Home" by Paul Anka

Songs
 Early Morning Rain, composed and recorded by Gordon Lightfoot.
 Mon Pays ("My Homeland") composed by Gilles Vigneault.
 Universal Soldier (song), written and recorded Buffy Sainte-Marie.
 You Were on My Mind, written by Sylvia Tyson.

Venues
 The Matador Club, a country-music venue, opens in Toronto.

Other
 10 April – Glenn Gould retires from public performance in Los Angeles.

Deaths
 7 January – Colin McPhee, composer and musicologist.
 9 September – Charles O'Neill, bandmaster, composer, organist, cornetist, and music educator.
 24 November – Georges-Émile Tanguay, composer, organist, pianist, and music educator.
 27 December – Pierre-Aurèle Asselin, tenor singer, brother to Marie-Anne Asselin.

See also 
 1964 in music
 1964 in Canada
 1964 in Canadian television

References 
Citations

Bibliography